Proctoporus spinalis, Boulenger's sun tegus, is a species of lizard in the family Gymnophthalmidae. It is endemic to Peru.

References

Proctoporus
Reptiles of Peru
Endemic fauna of Peru
Reptiles described in 1911
Taxa named by George Albert Boulenger
Taxobox binomials not recognized by IUCN